"Santa U Are the One" is a Christmas song written and composed by the Norwegian songwriter Ove Andre Brenna. It was first made popular by the Korean boy band Super Junior.

About the song
"Santa U Are the One" is an uptempo and cheerful Christmas song. The song is a tribute to Santa Claus – stating that Santa is the greatest for bringing the world joy and presents.

Artist releases

Super Junior (2011)
The song was the title track of SM Town's album 2011 Winter SMTown – The Warmest Gift. SM Town also released a video of the track featuring many of the entertainment companies' artists such as BoA, TVXQ, SHINee, Girls' Generation, Super Junior, Kangta, f(x), TRAX, The Grace, Zhang Liyin, and J-Min.

Alfred (2011)
The Swedish artist Alfred Olsson aka "Alfred" released the song as a digital Christmas single in Sweden and Norway for Christmas 2011. The song was especially popular on radio in Sweden, where around 30 radio channels played the song during December 2011.

Andrew Hotter (2020)
The Swedish Dj and artist Andrew Hotter released his own version of "Sana U are the One".

Appearance in movies

The Perfect Holiday (2007)
The song was featured in the Christmas film Perfect Holiday in a scene where Benjamin (Morris Chestnut) is working as Santa in a shopping mall. The movie also stars Queen Latifah and Terrence Howard.

A Dennis the Menace Christmas (2007)
The song appeared in A Dennis the Menace Christmas starring Robert Wagner and Maxwell Perry Cotton. The song is featured in a scene where Mr. Wilson (Robert Wagner) goes Christmas shopping with the kids.

References and external links
The Official South Korean Album chart
The Official Japanese Album chart
Soundtrack information for the movie "A Perfect Holiday"
Soundtrack information for the movie "A Dennis the Menace Christmas"
ITunes performance for Alfred – "Santa U Are The One"
SMTown homepage
Super Junior homepage 

Songs about Santa Claus
2011 songs